Space Hulk: Tactics is a turn-based strategy, tactical role-playing game developed by Cyanide and published by Focus Home Interactive. The game is set in the Warhammer 40,000 universe and is based upon the turn-based strategy tabletop miniatures board game Space Hulk. The game was released on 9 October 2018.

Gameplay 
Players can play as one of four chapters of Space Marines (Blood Angels, Dark Angels, Space Wolves and Ultramarines) or their opponents which are grotesque aliens known as Genestealers which come in four different factions. The game features two single-player campaigns, one you play as Blood Angels, the other as the Genestealers, along with competitive PvP multiplayer and a skirmish mode.The game also features a map builder allowing players to create their own maps and scenarios to share with others. The game is turn-based and features a card deck system.

Reception 

The Windows version holds a score of 73 on Metacritic. Charlier Hall for Polygon praised the customisation options for players. Fraser Brown, writing for Rock Paper Shotgun criticised the games pace and UI which "punishes even tiny mistakes".

References

External links
 

2018 video games
Multiplayer and single-player video games
PlayStation 4 games
Xbox One games
Video games based on board games
Video games developed in France
Warhammer 40,000 video games
Cyanide (company) games
Focus Entertainment games
Tactical role-playing video games
Turn-based strategy video games
Windows games